Escadron d'Hélicoptères 1/67 Pyrénées is a French Air and Space Force squadron located at Cazaux Air Base, Gironde, France which operates the Eurocopter EC725 Caracal.

See also

 List of French Air and Space Force aircraft squadrons

References

French Air and Space Force squadrons